Vengeance EP is the third overall solo album from Young Wicked and his first EP. The album was released on December 31, 2016, on Majik Ninja Entertainment when it was announced he was the new artist.

Background
Young Wicked took to social media in late 2016 to say that he was working on new music.

Promotion
On December 31, 2016, it was announced that Young Wicked left Psychopathic Records and signed with Majik Ninja Entertainment. That same day, two new shirts were available as well as Vengeance EP on Twiztid-Shop.com. Young Wicked also performed songs from the EP at Twiztid's New Years Evil 9 concert on December 31, 2016.

Track listing
Vendetta
Vengeance
Bloodbath (featuring Twiztid)
Scars
Solo Ride
Let It Go (featuring Bonez Dubb)

Personnel
Young Wicked – vocals, lyrics, production
Bonez Dubb – vocals, lyrics
Twiztid – vocals, lyrics

References

2016 EPs